Tautahi Gold is a former Tongan rugby union team that played in the Pacific Rugby Cup from 2006 to 2010. The other Tongan team in the Cup was  Tau'uta Reds. The team's name is from the Tautahi, which was Tonga's traditional Navy Army. Gold was chosen as the team's colour from the Sun which Tongans use as their navigational compass.

The home region of the Tautahi Gold team was a combination of Ha'apai, 'Eua and half of the Tongatapu Town District. It was important to the Union to make a home for the two teams to provide a pathway for players into Tonga's national rugby team.

Tautahi Gold were the Pacific Rugby Cup champions in 2008, defeating Upolu Samoa in the final played at Apia Park in Samoa on 14 May 2008.

Record

Honours
Pacific Rugby Cup
 Champion: 2008.

Season standings
Pacific Rugby Cup
{| class="wikitable" style="text-align:center;"
|- border=1 cellpadding=5 cellspacing=0
! style="width:20px;"|Year
! style="width:20px;"|Pos
! style="width:20px;"|Pld
! style="width:20px;"|W
! style="width:20px;"|D
! style="width:20px;"|L
! style="width:20px;"|F
! style="width:20px;"|A
! style="width:25px;"|+/-
! style="width:20px;"|BP
! style="width:20px;"|Pts
! style="width:50px;"|Final
! align=left|Notes 
|-
|align=left|2010
|align=left|3rd
|5||3||0||2||102||93||+9||2||14
| — ||align=left| Did not compete in finals
|-
|align=left|2009
|align=left|4th
|5||3||0||2||110||78||+32||3||15
| — ||align=left| Did not compete in finals
|-
|align=left|2008
|align=left|2nd 
|5||3||0||2||97||75||+22||1||13
|11–3 ||align=left| Won final against Upolu Samoa
|-
|align=left|2007
|align=left|6th
|5||2||0||3||84||98||−14||1||9
| — ||align=left| Did not compete in finals
|-
|align=left|2006
|align=left|6th
|5||1||1||3||62||94||−32||1||7
| — ||align=left| Did not compete in finals
|}

Squads

2010 squad

Internationally capped players 
  Isilele Matakaiongo Tupou
  Samisoni Pone
  Fangatapu 'Apikotoa
  Soane Havea
  Samiu Ika

References

Rugby union in Tonga